Linear is an American freestyle-pop group from Fort Lauderdale, Florida.

The lineup originally consisted of founder, vocalist, and main songwriter Charlie Pennachio, bassist and guitar player Wyatt Pauley, percussion player Joey Restivo, drummer Gerald Rappaport, guitarist Phil Conneilly, and backup vocalist/keyboardist Ricki Archer. In 1989, the band had a hit with the gold single, "Sending All My Love," which was self-released on Futura Records by Pennachio and producer Tolga Katas. After the regional success of the single, founder Charlie Pennachio added the remaining band members Pauley, Restivo, Rappaport, Conneilly and Archer. In January 1990, Linear was signed as a trio after the departure of Rappaport, Conneilly, and Archer by Marc Nathan at Atlantic Records. "Sending All My Love" reached number 5 on the Billboard Hot 100 in May 1990. The same year, they released their first, self-titled album, followed in 1992 by their second Caught in the Middle. They had another hit with the single, "T.L.C.", which reached number 30 and was nearly three decades later named one of Rolling Stone's 75 Greatest Boy Band Songs.  In subsequent years, the lineup would shuffle many times. Pauley took a brief hiatus from Linear to join his other band, Soko, signed to Atco Records. Pennachio would go on to add Mark Acetelli and Michael Dean to replace Pauley. Pauley would return in 1993, while Restivo would depart. Raul Prestol was then added.

Pennachio and Pauley remain as the current members of the original lineup, while Restivo performs under "Joey from Linear".

Career
After Pennachio and Tolga Katas finished recording "Sending All My Love," they would release it on their record label, Futura Records.

Atlantic Records re-released the single that charted in the U.S. Top 5 and earned RIAA Platinum certification. A self-titled album and two singles followed. Since then, Pennachio has become a music executive, manager, hit songwriter & producer.

Discography

Studio albums

Singles

References

American freestyle music groups
Musical groups from Florida
Musical groups established in 1989